Nigel Coates is an English architect.

Early life and education 
He grew up in the town of Malvern, Worcestershire and was educated at Hanley Castle Grammar School before studying at the University of Nottingham (1968–71) and the Architectural Association (1972-4). In 1985 he formed Branson Coates Architecture with Doug Branson before establishing his own studio of architecture and design in 2006.

Architectural career 
Coates' has designed buildings such as the Caffè Bongo (1986), Noah’s Ark (1988), The Wall (1990) and the Art Silo (1992), all in Japan, the Geffrye Museum extension, Oyster House, Powerhouse::uk (all 1998), and the National Centre for Popular Music (now the Sheffield Hallam Hubs music venue) in Sheffield (1999). His work is one of the most well known examples of the NATO (Narrative Architecture Today) movement.

Exhibitions and interiors
His work is held in several museum collections including the Victoria & Albert Museum London, FRAC Orléans, and the Museum for Architectural Drawing Berlin, including drawings of projects such as the House for Derek Jarman and the Tokyo Wall. Coates has designed several shops for fashion designer Katharine Hamnett, the Living Bridges exhibition at the Royal Academy of Arts (1996), the British Pavilion at Expo '98 in Lisbon, the Body Zone at London's Millennium Dome, the Jigsaw flagship store on Knightsbridge, Ecstacity in the British Pavilion at the 2000 Venice Architecture Biennale, Mixtacity (part of the Global Cities exhibition) at Tate Modern in 2007, his Hypnerotosphere installation at the 2008 Venice Architecture Biennale (a collaboration with film maker John Maybury), the 2009 refurbishment of Middle and Over Wallop restaurants at Glyndebourne Opera House and the installation 'Picaresque', part of the 2012 exhibition Kama: Sesso e Design at the Triennale di Milano.

Academic career
He was Unit Master at the Architectural Association from 1978 to 1988. From 1995 to 2011 he was Professor and Head of the Department of Architecture at the Royal College of Art and in 2011 was made Emeritus Professor. In 2012 Nigel Coates was awarded the RIBA Annie Spink Award in recognition of an outstanding contribution to architectural education. He is Chair of the Academic Court at the London School of Architecture.

Related publications 
Nigel Coates, Narrative Break Up, ed. Nigel Coates and Bernard Tschumi, The Discourse of Events, AA Publications, 1983
Nigel Coates ed., NATØ magazines Nos. 1 Albion, 1983; 2 Apprentice, 1984; 3 Gamma City, 1985, all AA Publications
Nigel Coates, Street Signs, ed. John Thackara, Design After Modernism, Thames & Hudson, 1988
Rick Poynor, Nigel Coates: The City in Motion, Fourth Estate, 1989
Metropolis, Linda Brown and Deyan Sudjic, ICA 1988
Nigel Coates, Ecstacity, AA Publications, 1992
Jonathan Glancey, Body Buildings and City Scapes, Thames & Hudson, 1999
Nigel Coates, Guide to Ecstacity, Laurence King, 2003
Nigel Coates, Collidoscope, Laurence King 2004
Alessandra Orlandi, Interview with Nigel Coates, The Plan 006, 2004
Jenny Dalton, Coates of many Colours, How To Spend It, Financial Times, April 2009
Aaron Betsky, Out There: Architecture Beyond Buildings, La Biennale di Venezia, 2008
Guido Incerti, Interview with Nigel Coates, Klat magazine 05, Spring 2011
Nigel Coates, Narrative Architecture, Wiley,  2012
Kama: Sesso e Design, catalogue ed. Silvana Annicchiarico, Triennale Design Museum, 2012
Marjanović and Howard, Drawing Ambience, RISD 2015
Claire Jamieson: NATØ: Narrative Architecture in Postmodern London, Routledge, 2017

References

External links 
Nigel Coates website
London School of Architecture website
Portrait of the artist: Nigel Coates, architect interview in The Guardian
Nigel Coates profile on Architonic
Nigel Coates on Pamono e-commerce
Nigel Coates interviewed on Crane TV
Nigel Coates

Living people
Place of birth missing (living people)
Architects from Worcestershire
English furniture designers
People educated at Hanley Castle High School
Alumni of the Architectural Association School of Architecture
Year of birth missing (living people)